Nahid Tajeddin is an Iranian reformist politician and current member of the Parliament of Iran representing Isfahan electoral district.

References 

1976 births
Living people
Executives of Construction Party politicians
Members of the 10th Islamic Consultative Assembly
Politicians from Isfahan
University of Isfahan alumni
Islamic Azad University alumni
Tarbiat Modares University alumni